Daniel Siebert may refer to:

 Daniel Lee Siebert (1954–2008), American serial killer
 Daniel Siebert (ethnobotanist) (born 1968), American ethnobotanist, pharmacognosist, and author
 Daniel Siebert (referee) (born 1984), German referee